Ann Veronica Janssens is a Belgian contemporary visual artist born in 1956 in Folkestone, United Kingdom. She lives and works in Brussels, Belgium. Her work is an invitation to ephemeral experiences, which are at times delirious or vertiginous, and lead to the loss of control or landmarks, generating a sentiment of visual, physical, temporal or psychological fragility.

Janssens has explored practical and theoretical research connecting space, time, body and brain, by bringing together artists and researchers in neurosciences, astrophysics, biology, geology, art history and philosophy.

In 2012 she was appointed Head of Studio at the National School of Fine Arts in Paris, France.

Work

Janssens' work presents decisive visual experiences. Her work is inspired by nature, science, and minimalism. Variations in the atmospheric light in Kinshasa, the city in Congo where she grow up, made a deep impression on her, as did the handling of geometry and light in Mies van der Rohe's work, notably his Barcelona Pavilion. Originally she wanted to be an architect, like her father, but she began to move away from this discipline as it struck her as rather too functional. She explored artistic discoveries that included sculptures of Henry Moore, and was influenced by Maria Wierusz Kowalski (known as  Tapta), with whom she had worked as assistant at La Cambre art school in Brussels.

Janssens mainly does site-specific works. She takes a specific space as her starting point and adds forms and volumes to the existing architecture. Often she chooses unexpected, unobvious places like a stairway, a ceiling or a window ledge. Her interventions bring the specific qualities of an environment to light. She sets out signposts intended to let viewers define themselves against reality. In what way does our point of view determine our perception? How does the viewer relate vis-à-vis a specific place? 
For a public space art project such as The Neon Parallax in Geneva, for example, she used a misspelled text found on the ground as starting point for a large neon installation on the rooftop of a building.

Originally she worked chiefly with industrial materials – concrete, wood and glass – and primary forms. Since 1990 her work increasingly displays a more immaterial character: light, sound and fog instead of rough building materials. These works lead to a drastic total-experience that completely changes the viewer's perception of the space.

Exhibitions

Solo exhibitions 
Janssens' work has been the subject of numerous institutional solo exhibitions:

 "Hot Pink Turquoise" at South London Gallery, UK, and Louisiana Museum of Modern Art, Denmark (2020); at the Museum De Pont, Netherlands (2018)
 Museum Kiasma, Finland, and The Baltimore Museum of Art, USA: "mars" at Institut d’Art Contemporain, Villeurbanne/Rhône-Alpes (2017)
 Nasher Sculpture Center, Dallas, Texas, USA (2016)
 "yellowbluepink" at the Wellcome Collection, London, UK (2015)
 M.A.K., the Museum of Contemporary Art, Ghent, Belgium (2015)
 "Philaetchouri" in collaboration with Michel François at Foundation d’Enterprise Hermès, Brussels, Belgium (2015)
 Museo Capella San Severo, with Nord Project, Naples, Italy (2014); Eglise Sainte-Honorat des Alyscamps, Arles, France (2013)
 FRAC Corse, Corte, France (2013)
 The Beppu project, Japan (2012)
 Ausstellungshalle Zeitgenössische Kunst, Münster, Germany (2010)
 "Are you experienced" at the Espai d'art contemporani Castelló, Spain (2009)
 "Serendipity" at WIELS, Brussels, BE (2009)
 "An den Frühling" at Museum Morsbroich, Leverkusen, Germany (2007)
 "Aux Origines de l’Abstraction 1800 /1914 – Rouge 106 – Bleu 132" at Musée d’Orsay, Paris, FR (2003)
 CCA Wattis Institute, San Francisco, USA (2003)
 Ikon Gallery, Birmingham, UK (2002)
 Kunsthalle Bern, Switzerland (2002)
 "Works for Space" at Kunstverein München, Munich, Germany (2001)
 "Light Games" at the Neue Nationalgalerie, Berlin, Germany (2001)
 "In the absence of light it is possible to create the brightest images within oneself" at Salzburger Kunstverein, Austria (2000)

In 1999 she represented Belgium at the 48th Venice Biennale with Michel François, and her work was part of other international biennials:

 The Sharjah Biennial 14 (2019)
 Manifesta 10, St-Petersburg, RU (2014)
 18th biennale of Sydney, AUS (2012)
 Manifesta 8, Murcia (2011
 5th International Media Art Biennale Seoul, KR (2006)
 11th biennale of Sydney, AUS (1998)
 5th International biennale of Istanbul, TR (1997)
 22nd International Biennale of São Paulo, BR (1994)

Group exhibitions 
Since 1985, Janssens has participated in major group exhibitions:
 "Perspectives minimales en Belgique" at le Delta, Namur–BE (2022)
 "Light & Space" at Copenhagen Contemporary, Copenhagen–DK (2021)
 "Space Shifters" at Hayward Gallery, London–UK (2018)
 "Le musée absent" in Wiels, Brussels–B (2017)
 "Illumination" at the Louisiana Museum of Modern Art, Humlebæk–DK (2016)
 "Another Minimalism" at the Fruitmarket Gallery, Edinburgh–UK (2015)
 "Zehn Räume Drei Loggien und Ein Saal" at the Sprengel Museum, Hanover–DE (2015)
 "Simple Forms" at the Centre Pompidou Metz–FR and the Mori Art Museum, Tokyo–J (2014
 "Light Show" at the Hayward Gallery, London–UK, the Museum of Contemporary Art of Sydney–AU and the Sharjah Art Foundation–UAE (2013–2015)
 "Dynamo. Un siècle de lumière et de mouvement dans l'art 1913-2013" at the Galeries Nationales du Grand Palais, Paris–FR (2013)
 "Fruits de la Passion" at the Centre Pompidou, Paris–FR (2012)
 "unExhibit" at the Generali Foundation, Vienna–AT (2011)
 "Universal Code" at The Power Plant - Contemporary Art Gallery, Ontario–CA (2009)
 "Ecstasy, In And About Altered States" at MOCA, Los Angeles–USA (2005)
 "Natuurlijk" at the Kröller- Müller Museum, Otterlo–NL (2002)
 "Stimuli" at the Witte de With and Museum Boijmans Van Beuningen, Rotterdam, Netherlands (1999).
 "Prismes. Goethe. Réflexions contemporaines", CEAAC, Strasbourg (2020)

Collections 
Janssens' works are held in the following permanent collections:
 Caldic Collectie, Museum Voorlinden, Wassenaar, The Netherlands
Centre Pompidou, Paris, France
De Pont Museum of Contemporary Art, Tilburg, The Netherlands
 Frac Aquitaine, Bordeaux,  France
Frac Bourgogne, Dijon, France
Frac Corsica, Corti, France
Frac Franche-Comté, Besançon, France
Frac île-de-France, Paris, France
Frac Pays des Pays de la Loire, La Fleuriaye, France
Frac Grand Large, Dunkerque, France
 49 Nord 6 Est - Frac Lorraine, Metz, France
Frac Occitanie Montpellier, France
, France
Kunstverein München, Munich, Germany
 Louisiana MoMA, Humlebæk, Denmark
Middelheimmusseum, Antwerp, Belgium
Museum of Contemporary Arts of the Wallonia-Brussels Federation (MACS), Belgium
Strasbourg Museum of Modern and Contemporary Art, Strasbourg, France
Musée d'Ixelles, Brussels, Belgium
Museo Jumex, Mexico city, Mexico
 Royal Museums of Fine Arts of Belgium, Brussels, Belgium
, Marseille, France
M – Museum Leuven, Belgium
Mu.ZEE, Oostende, Belgium
Museum of Contemporary Art, Antwerp, Antwerp, Belgium
Museum of Old and New Art, Hobart Tasmania
Museu Berardo, Lisbon, Portugal
Pinault Collection, Paris, France
Tel Aviv Museum of Art, Tel Aviv, Israel
 Nasher Sculpture Center, Dallas, USA
 S.M.A.K., Gent, Belgium

Further reading

Artist’s books 
 Ann Veronica Janssens. Chapelle Saint-Vincent Grignan, Ronny Van De Velde ed., Berchem, 2013
 L’éclipse de l’objet, l’éclipse du sujet, l’éclipse de l’âme comme la neige, Nico Dockx, Ann Veronica Janssens, Jan Mast, Krist Torfs, 2010-2011
 Experienced, Base Publishing, Brussels, 2009
 0032 2, Edition Camille von Scholz, Brussels, 2001
 Het raadsel van de verdwenen kat/l'énigme du chat perdu, Ann Veronica Janssens / Hans Theys, Ministerie van de Vlaamse Gemeenschap, Brussels, 1999
 Maroc 1993, Michel François / Ann Veronica Janssens, Fondation pour l'architecture, Bruxelles, 1993
 Éclipse. Les artistes/the artists, Monika Droste / Michel Francois / Luc Grossen / Ann Veronica Janssens, Brussels, 1981

Essays 
 "Physical Realisations of the Unthinkable / Concrétisations physiques de l’impensable ", Guillaume Desanges, Catalogue S.M.A.K, 2015
 "Women’s work Is never Done, An anthology", Catherine de Zegher, 2014
 "Physical realisations of unthinkable", Guillaume Desange, 2015
 "Endless andness the politic of abstraction according to Ann Veronica Janssens", Mieke Bal, Bloomsbury Publishing, 2013
 "Expérience esthétique et art contemporain", Marianne Massin, Presses Universitaires de Rennes, 2013
 "Woman Artists at the Millenium", Carol Armstrong & Catherine de Zegher, MIT press, 2006
 "Quoting Caravaggio", Mieke Bal, The University of Chicago Press, 1999
 "Inside the Visible: An Elliptical Traverse of Twentieth Century Art in, of, and from the Feminine ", Catherine de Zegher, MIT Press, 1996.
 "Travelling concepts", Mieke Bal, University of Toronto Press, 2002
 "Narratology, Intro. to the Theory of Narrative 3rd edition", M. Bal, University of Toronto Press, 2009

References

1956 births
Living people
20th-century English women artists
21st-century English women artists
Artists from Brussels
Artists from Kent
British contemporary artists
Light artists
Minimalist artists
People from Folkestone